In class-based programming, downcasting or type refinement is the act of casting a reference of a base class to one of its derived classes.

In many programming languages, it is possible to check through type introspection to determine whether the type of the referenced object is indeed the one being cast to or a derived type of it, and thus issue an error if it is not the case.

In other words, when a variable of the base class (parent class) has a value of the derived class (child class), downcasting is possible.

Some languages, such as OCaml, disallow downcasting.

Examples

Java 
public class Fruit{}  // parent class
public class Apple extends Fruit{}  // child class

public static void main(String[] args) {
    // The following is an implicit upcast:
    Fruit parent = new Apple();
    // The following is a downcast. Here, it works since the variable `parent` is
    // holding an instance of Apple:
    Apple child = (Apple)parent;
//Where Apple is Child Class But Fruit is Parent Class
}

C++ 
// Parent class:
class Fruit {
 public:
  // Must be polymorphic to use runtime-checked dynamic-cast.
  virtual ~Fruit() = default;
};

// Child class:
class Apple : public Fruit {};

int main(int argc, const char** argv) {
  // The following is an implicit upcast:
  Fruit* parent = new Apple();
  // The following is a downcast. Here, it works since the variable `parent` is
  // holding an instance of Apple:
  Apple* child = dynamic_cast<Apple*>(parent);
}

Uses

Downcasting is useful when the type of the value referenced by the Parent variable is known and often is used when passing a value as a parameter. In the below example, the method objectToString takes an Object parameter which is assumed to be of type String.
public static String objectToString(Object myObject) {
    // This will only work when the myObject currently holding value is string.
    return (String)myObject;
}

public static void main(String[] args) {
    // This will work since we passed in String, so myObject has value of String.
    String result = objectToString("My String");
    Object iFail = new Object();
    // This will fail since we passed in Object which does not have value of String.
    result = objectToString(iFail);
}
In this approach, downcasting prevents the compiler from detecting a possible error and instead causes a run-time error.
Downcasting myObject to String ('(String)myObject') was not possible at compile time because there are times that myObject is String type, so only at run time can we figure out whether the parameter passed in is logical. While we could also convert myObject to a compile-time String using the universal java.lang.Object.toString(), this would risk calling the default implementation of toString() where it was unhelpful or insecure, and exception handling could not prevent this.

In C++, run-time type checking is implemented through dynamic_cast. Compile-time downcasting is implemented by static_cast, but this operation performs no type check. If it is used improperly, it could produce undefined behavior.

Considerations

A popular example of a badly considered design is containers of top types, like the Java containers before Java generics were introduced, which requires downcasting of the contained objects so that they can be used again.

See also
Subtype polymorphism

References

External links
Downcasting is a Code Smell by Jeremy D. Miller
A downcasting tragedy by Jimmy Bogard
Prefer polymorphism over instanceof and downcasting by Bill Venners
Downcasting in C# by Scott Lysle
Multiple downcasting techniques
Upcasting, downcasting by Sinipull

Class (computer programming)
Articles with example Java code